Chromepet is a suburban neighbourhood of Chennai, India. Located in the southern Chennai Metropolitan Area, it is governed by the Tambaram Municipal Corporation. Chromepet is located 22 km from the Chennai Central Railway Station, and lies on the Grand Southern Trunk (GST road), close to Thirumudivakkam and Tambaram, and next to Pallavaram. The 200-feet road connects Chromepet with Thoraipakkam. Chromepet is 6 km from Outer Ring Road, Thirumudivakkam, and 4 km south of the Chennai International Airport at Trisulam.

The neighbourhood is home to the Madras Institute of Technology, whose alumni include former president of India A. P. J. Abdul Kalam and Tamil writer Sujatha. The neighbourhood is served by the Chromepet railway station of the Chennai Suburban Railway Network and is a residential locality. Chromepet votes for the Sriperumbudur parliamentary constituency in the Indian national elections.

Etymology 
Chromepet is actually not a Tamil name. Earlier, the town was the home of Chrome Leathers and hence the name Chromepet—chrome (for the factory) and pettai (Tamil: பேட்டை in Tamil meaning suburb). The Balaji Hospital now stands on the grounds of the factory.

History 
Together with Pallavaram, the Chromepet area was referred to as "Pallavapuram." The area was part of Thondaimandalam ruled by Thondaimaans who were allied with the early Cholas from around the 1st to 2nd century CE. Later, the area was passed on to the chieftains of the Satavahanas. Chennai, Chengalpet, and the surrounding areas belonged to the Thondai Nadu during the Pallava period (3rd to 7th century CE). The historic period proper begins with the Pallava kings and the earliest of their stone inscriptions is found nearby in Pallavaram (Pallava Puram) in a cave temple excavated by Mahendravarman I (600–630 CE). Narasimhavarman I who succeeded Mahendravarman I waged battles against Pulekesin of the Chalukya dynasty and defeated him at Manimangalam, which is 11 km (6.8 mi) south-west of Chromepet.

Chola period 
During the later Chola period (9th to 12th century CE) the area, which is now called Chromepet, belonged to the Churathur Nadu, named after Thiruchuram, the modern Trisulam village near Pallavaram. The Churathur Nadu extended from Tambaram in the south to Adambakkam and Alandur in the north and included Pammal, Pallavaram and Tiruneermalai.

Pandya, Chola, Vijayanagar 
Later the lands passed on to Pandya, Chola and the Vijayanagar dynasties between the 12th and 15th centuries.

British rule 
During the British rule in the 18th century, the leather industries developed in the southwest part of the city. The Chrome Leather Company was established in this area in 1912 by European merchant Alexander Chambers. After his lifetime, the Chrome Leather Company was run by his wife Ida L. Chambers. She became the sole owner of the Chrome Leather Company and its properties in 1965 through an Order and Decree passed by the Honourable Court, Madras. She died in 1968.

Today the lands and properties of Chrome Leather Company belong to the late Ida L. Chambers, and most of the land to the west of the railway station is owned by CLC.

After independence, the Madras Institute of Technology (MIT) was founded in 1949 in an area extending over 20 hectares at Chromepet. Residential and commercial development started in the 1960s. Kulasekarapuram is the name of the area before MIT was established.

Post-Independence 
Development of New Colony and the auction of residential lots in the early 1950s, by the Chrome Leather Company, led to rapid residential and commercial development of the Chromepet area.

Location in Context

Neighbourhood newspapers 
GST Road News
Chrompet Times
Chrompet Talk

Transportation links 
Chromepet is connected to the city of Chennai by public transportation services including the electric train service that was built during British rule. Chromepet is located on the Beach – Tambaram – Chengalpattu suburban railway network. See Chennai suburban railway.

Chromepet is 3 km away from Chennai Airport. The Pallavaram – Perungudi bypass road connects Chromepet with Adambakkam, Nanganallur, Madipakkam, Medavakkam, Velacheri and Perungudi. Chitlapakkam main road connects Chromepet with Selaiyur and East Tambaram.

The Grand Southern Trunk Road (GST) that connects south Indian cities to Chennai passes through this township.

The MIT Flyover connects Grand Southern Trunk Road (GST) with Hasthinapuram and Chitlapakkam.
The Flyover (near Ponds company) connects Tiruneermalai on the west and Thoraipakkam 100 feet outer ring road with the GST.

There is a bus stand in Hasthinapuram, a neighborhood on the eastern side of Chromepet Railway Station. Buses to Tambaram, Guduvanchery, T. Nagar, High Court, Chengalpet, Avadi, Pallavaram, Velachery, Vandalur, Pozhichalur, Broadway, etc. are available from Hasthinapuram.

There is a bus stop in Grant Southern Trunk Road(GST).
There is also a Metropolitan Transportation Corporation Chennai(MTC) bus building centre and MTC bus depo in East side of Chromepet

Cultural Academy 

The Chromepet cultural academy is famous in almost any part of the Chennai city. Occasionally there will be Carnatic Kacheries performed by great artists in cultural academy. The experts from other places in Chennai come to sing songs during the 'Margazhi utsav'.

Notes

References 

 Chennai history
 Tambaram history
 More inscriptions from the Tambaram area

Suburbs of Chennai
Neighbourhoods in Chennai
Cities and towns in Chennai district